Royal Victoria Station is on the Docklands Light Railway (DLR) in Canning Town, east London. The station opened in 1994 and is named after the nearby Royal Victoria Dock. It is on the DLR's Beckton branch, in Travelcard Zone 3, and is the nearest station for the northern terminus of the London Cable Car and for London's new City Hall.

History
The station is located on a stretch of line first opened in 1855, when the Eastern Counties Railway (ECR) was forced to divert its line to North Woolwich (the former Eastern Counties and Thames Junction Railway) around the newly opened Royal Victoria Dock. This line went on to become part of National Rail's North London line, although there was never a station at the site until the coming of the Docklands Light Railway.

When the Docklands Light Railway extension to Beckton was constructed in the 1990s, its tracks, between Canning Town and Custom House stations, were constructed on the same right of way but to the west and south side of the existing tracks. Royal Victoria station opened on the Docklands Light Railway tracks on 28 March 1994, whilst North London Line trains continued to pass without stopping on their tracks until that section of the line closed on 9 December 2006.

During 2009, as part of the Canning Town DLR flyover and the new DLR line from Canning Town to Stratford, an engineers' siding was added to the Victoria Dock Road side of the station.

On 1 June 2009 the Beckton branch was diverted onto the new flyover, which crossed the Woolwich branch and the branch to Stratford International. The flyover was constructed as part of the 3-Car Capacity Enhancement Project to serve Canning Town high-level DLR station. (See main article Docklands Light Railway extension to Stratford International.) It is 330 metres long, and is formed from a number of different structures connected by a continuous reinforced concrete deck cast in situ. In addition, it allows DLR services from Canning Town towards Woolwich and Beckton to depart from any eastbound DLR platform.

Connections
London Buses routes 147, 474 and night route N551 serve the station.

References

External links
Docklands Light Railway website – Royal Victoria station page

Docklands Light Railway stations in the London Borough of Newham
Railway stations in Great Britain opened in 1994
Station